Sandro Simonet (born 5 July 1995) is a Swiss World Cup alpine ski racer and competes primarily in slalom. He made his World Cup debut in November 2016 and gained his first podium in January 2021, a third place in slalom at Chamonix, France.

Simonet has competed at two World Championships, and won a gold medal in the team event in 2019.

World Cup results

Season standings

Race podiums

 1 podium – (1 SL); 2 top tens

World Championship results

References

External links

 
Sandro Simonet at Swiss Ski Team 

1995 births
Living people
Swiss male alpine skiers
Place of birth missing (living people)
Youth Olympic gold medalists for Switzerland
Alpine skiers at the 2012 Winter Youth Olympics
21st-century Swiss people